Aranđel Stojković (born on 2 March, 1995) is the Serbian footballer, who plays as a defender for TSC Bačka Topola.

Club career
Born in Belgrade, Stojković joined BSK Borča in 2013, where he started his senior career same year. He made several appearances during the 2013–14 season, and after he ended his youth career, he became the first choice on right-back place for the next season. He was called to U20 national team and played some friendly matches, but he was not in squad for World Cup. Stojković joined OFK Beograd beginning of 2016. In September 2016, Stojković signed with Spartak Subotica, where he stayed for 2 seasons. On 16 June, 2018, Stojković moved to Vojvodina. The transfer fee was reported as €100k plus 10 percent of the future transfer.

Career statistics

Club

Honours
Vojvodina
Serbian Cup: 2019–20

References

External links
 
 

1995 births
Living people
Footballers from Belgrade
Serbian footballers
FK BSK Borča players
OFK Beograd players
FK Spartak Subotica players
FK Vojvodina players
Serbian First League players
Serbian SuperLiga players
Association football fullbacks
Serbia international footballers